Cultural Studies is a bimonthly peer-reviewed academic journal covering research on the relation between cultural practices, everyday life, material, economic, political, geographical, and historical contexts. The current editor-in-chief is Ted Striphas (University of Colorado Boulder). Lawrence Grossberg (University of North Carolina), who has served as editor-in-chief from 1990 until 2018 is currently involved as Editor Emeritus. Former co-editors include Janice Radway (1991–1995) and Della Pollock (1995–2013). Cultural Studies was preceded by the Australian Journal of Cultural Studies, published at the Western Australian Institute of Technology. The journal was established under its current name in 1987. Originally published by Methuen Publishing, it transferred to Routledge when the Methuen imprint was sold by then-owner International Thomson Organization to Octopus Publishing.

Abstracting and indexing 
The journal is abstracted and indexed in

According to the Journal Citation Reports, the journal has a 2012 impact factor of 0.526.

References

External links 
 
 Australian Journal of Cultural Studies at Murdoch University

Taylor & Francis academic journals
English-language journals
Cultural journals
Publications established in 1987
Bimonthly journals